Jyeshtha ("The Elder" or "Older" in Sanskrit) is the 18th nakshatra or lunar mansion in Hindu astronomy and  Vedic astrology associated with the string of the constellation Scorpii, and the stars ε, ζ1 Sco, η, θ,  ι1 Sco, κ, λ, μ and ν  Scorpionis.

Astrology
The symbol of Jyeshtha is a circular amulet, umbrella, or earring, and it is associated with Indra, chief of the gods. The lord of Jyeshtha is Budha (Mercury). Jyestha is termed in Malayalam as Thrikketta and in Tamil as Kēttai. The nakshtra is called honorifically as Trikkētta (Tiru + Kētta). Jyeshtha nakshatra corresponds to Antares.

The Ascendant/Lagna in Jyeshtha indicates a person with a sense of seniority and superiority, who is protective, responsible and a leader of their family. They are wise, profound, psychic, maybe with occult powers, and are courageous and inventive.
Under the traditional Hindu principle of naming individuals according to their Ascendant/Lagna, the following Sanskrit syllables correspond with this Nakshatra, and would belong at the beginning of a first name:
No 
Ya 
Yi
Yu

References

Nakshatra